The Preamble to the Constitution Act, 1867 is a provision of the Constitution of Canada, setting out some of the general goals and principles of the Act.  Although not itself a substantive provision, the courts have used it as a guide to the interpretation of the Constitution of Canada, particularly unwritten constitutional principles which inform the history and meaning of the Constitution.

The Constitution Act, 1867 is the constitutional statute which established Canada.  Originally named the British North America Act, 1867, the Act continues to be the foundational statute for the Constitution of Canada, although it has been amended many times since 1867.  It is now recognised as part of the supreme law of Canada.

Constitution Act, 1867
The Constitution Act, 1867 is part of the Constitution of Canada and thus part of the "supreme law of Canada".  It was the product of extensive negotiations between the provinces of British North America in the 1860s.  The Act sets out the constitutional framework of Canada, including the structure of the federal government and the powers of the federal government and the provinces. Originally enacted by the British Parliament under the name the British North America Act, 1867, in 1982 the Act was brought under full Canadian control through the Patriation of the Constitution, and was re-named the Constitution Act, 1867.  Since Patriation the Act can only be amended in Canada, under the amending formula set out in the Constitution Act, 1982.

Text of the Preamble
The Preamble reads:

The Preamble has not been amended since it was enacted in 1867.

Explanation in the Remuneration of Judges Reference

The Preamble has had a significant impact on constitutional jurisprudence concerning the nature of Canadian Confederation and the independence of the Canadian courts.

Although significant cases had been decided on the general nature of Confederation since the 1930s, it was not until 1997 that the Supreme Court of Canada endeavoured to explain and consolidate its jurisprudence that derives from the Preamble. Lamer C.J. summarized it thus:

 preambles can be used to identify the purpose of a statute, and also as an aid to construing ambiguous statutory language
 the preamble is not only a key to construing the express provisions of the Constitution Act, 1867, but also invites the use of those organizing principles to fill out gaps in the express terms of the constitutional scheme
 it speaks of the desire of the founding provinces “to be federally united into One Dominion”, and thus, addresses the structure of the division of powers
 by its reference to “a Constitution similar in Principle to that of the United Kingdom”, the preamble indicates that the legal and institutional structure of constitutional democracy in Canada should be similar to that of the legal regime out of which the Canadian Constitution emerged
 it points to the nature of the legal order that envelops and sustains Canadian society. In Re Manitoba Language Rights that is described as “an actual order of positive laws”, which is embraced by the notion of the rule of law
 one example where the Court has inferred a fundamental constitutional rule which is not found in express terms is the doctrine of full faith and credit, where the courts of one province are under a constitutional obligation to recognize the decisions of the courts of another province (as noted in Hunt v. T&N plc)
 another example where the Court has inferred a basic rule of Canadian constitutional law despite the silence of the constitutional text is the doctrine of paramountcy
 it also provides for the constitutionalization of legislative privileges for Parliament and the provincial legislatures, to ensure that they can perform their functions free from interference by the Crown and the courts
 there is  interdependence between democratic governance and freedom of political speech, and only Parliament can legislate any limitation of political expression
 the judicial independence of the courts is guaranteed

Notable cases
 Re Manitoba Language Rights, [1985] 1 SCR 721, 1985 CanLII 33 (SCC)

References

Further reading

 

Constitution of Canada
Canadian Confederation
Federalism in Canada
Constitution Act, 1867